Nagorny is a rural locality (a settlement) in Verkhnedobrinskoye Rural Settlement, Kamyshinsky District, Volgograd Oblast, Russia. The population was 174 as of 2010. There are 5 streets.

Geography 
Nagorny is located on the Volga Upland, 34 km northeast of Kamyshin (the district's administrative centre) by road. Nizhnyaya Dobrinka is the nearest rural locality.

References 

Rural localities in Kamyshinsky District